The Al-Tanf offensive was a two-day offensive launched by the Free Syrian Army backed by the U.S.-led Coalition against the Islamic State of Iraq and the Levant (ISIL), aiming to recapture the Al Waleed border crossing, known in Syria as Al-Tanf. Al-Tanf had been captured by ISIL from the Syrian Government in May 2015 and had been used by ISIL to shift militants and resources across the border.

On 3 March 2016, Syrian rebels took the offensive to capture al-Tanf, and after several hours of fighting captured the border post.

ISIL counter-attacked several hours later, and recapturing the post. Fighting continued until the next day, in which the rebels repelled ISIL fighters and recaptured the post.

References

Military operations of the Syrian civil war in 2016
Military operations of the Syrian civil war involving the Free Syrian Army
Military operations of the Syrian civil war involving the United States
Conflicts in 2016
Military operations of the Syrian civil war involving the Islamic State of Iraq and the Levant
Homs Governorate in the Syrian civil war